JDO may refer to:

 Java Data Objects
 Jewish Defense Organization
 the IATA code for Juazeiro do Norte Airport